The Seekers  is a 1954 British-New Zealand adventure film directed by Ken Annakin. It starred Jack Hawkins, Glynis Johns, Noel Purcell, and Kenneth Williams. The film was produced by the Rank Organisation and was shot at Pinewood Studios with location shooting around Whakatane. The film's sets were designed by the art director Maurice Carter with costumes by Julie Harris. It was the first major international studio film shot in New Zealand. The film was adapted from the novel The Seekers by New Zealander John Guthrie. It was released in the United States by Universal Pictures as Land of Fury.

Plot
In 1821, a British sailing ship, the Becket, anchors off the New Zealand coast. Philip Wayne (Hawkins) and Paddy Clarke (Purcell), respectively First Mate and Bos'un, land to explore. They discover a Māori burial cave, but are captured by the local tribe. Accused of sacrilege, they manage to impress the tribesmen enough to be offered a trial by challenge, in which Wayne succeeds. The Māori chief, Hongi Tepe (Inia Te Wiata), is impressed enough to adopt Wayne and allot him a portion of land. The sailors return to the ship which sails back to England.

Arriving there, Wayne and Clarke are set up by the corrupt Captain Bryce on charges of murdering the natives and bringing Britain into disrepute because they have a severed Māori head in their trunk. This had been presented to Wayne as a traditional gift by the Māori chief, but, rejected by him, Bryce had recovered it. Found guilty, Wayne and Clarke have to pay heavy fines to avoid imprisonment. Wayne decides to leave Britain to find a new life and to return to New Zealand. Nevertheless, his fiancée, Marion, still wants to marry him. They sail over, with Clarke, on a private ship and Wayne builds a house close to the Māori tribe he had met before.

The house is completed and a tenuous peace is established with the local Māori, although some remain hostile. Marion starts teaching Hongi Tepe and some others English, using the Bible, and tells them about her Christian religion. The chief's wife hovers around Wayne frequently.
 
The Becket returns and Wayne confronts Bryce, who is found to be smuggling decapitated heads of dead Māori captives into Britain as potentially profitable 'souvenirs'. News later arrives by the six-monthly ship that Wayne has been appointed a justice of the peace for his locality, and also that he and Clarke have been exonerated by a court of appeal.

Wishart and Sergeant Paul join the small group just as Marion finds herself pregnant. After the birth, Hongi Tepe's wife follows Wayne when he goes hunting, and as he settles down to sleep she joins him and they kiss. Hongi Tepe sees them and wants to kill his wife, as is the tribal custom, but his new-found Christianity sways him to let her live. However, a rift between the English and Māori begins.

Wishart accidentally shoots a Māori's dog (thinking it is a goat) and the owner starts fighting him. His gun goes off and shoots the warrior dead. The Māori capture Wishart. Wayne is determined to dispense justice, telling the Māori that he is acting with the authority of his own powerful king. The chief's loyalties are also torn as he knows about Wayne's treachery. Wayne gets Wishart away by promising the Māori that he will be returned to England for trial by his own people. However, they then fear a reprisal attack by the Māori.

Wayne tells Marion that he has been "unfaithful" and although deeply hurt she says she still loves him. Meanwhile, Hongi Tepe's tribe has formed a truce with their local enemy, and the enemy tribe declare a desire to kill the colonists. Hongi Tepe's wife hears this and goes to warn Wayne, but she is waylaid by the hostile Māori.

A battle begins in the night, and the colonists defend themselves. Initially successful because of their muskets, the colonists eventually find themselves outnumbered and under siege. The attackers use large catapults and fire-bombs to set the house alight. Hongi Tepe's tribe appear and start fighting their old enemies. In mid-battle, Wayne saves Hongi Tepe's life by shooting his attacker. As the battle appears won, Wishart is killed by a spear, and then, with the house ablaze, the roof collapses, killing all the colonists.

The sole British survivor is Philip and Marion's young baby, Richard, whom Marion had secreted in a safe place outside, and who is found and adopted by Hongi Tepe.

Finally, the friendly Māori watch a new group of colonists arriving on the beach.

Cast
 Jack Hawkins as Philip Wayne
 Noel Purcell as Paddy Clarke
 Glynis Johns as Marion Southey
 Inia Te Wiata as Hongi Tepe
 Kenneth Williams as Peter Wishart
 Laya Raki as Moana
 Thomas Heathcote as Sgt. Paul
 Francis De Wolff as Capt. Bryce
 Norman Mitchell as Grayson
 Ian Fleming as 	Mr. Southey
 James Copeland as Mackay
 Henry Gilbert as 	Aspiti Tohunga

Production details
Jack Hawkins was attracted to the role because it represented a change of pace from the war films in which he had become a star. Javanese-German actress Laya Raki was cast as a Māori. A publicist for the film said:
Laya has a strong Polynesian cast of feature. We had tested several Māori girls, some of them beautiful, but somehow the cameras didn't take to them. You know how people photograph differently from the way they really look... Well, when we stumbled across Laya Raki and tested her, she photographed ideally for the part. She looks more like a Māori than a Māori.
Location shooting was undertaken around Whakatane in the eastern Bay of Plenty.

The world premiere of the film was held in Wellington, New Zealand on 24 June 1954.

Release
According to Kinematograph Weekly the film was a "money maker" at the British box office in 1954.

References

External links

The Seekers (1954) at New Zealand Feature Film Database

1954 films
1950s adventure drama films
New Zealand adventure films
Films based on New Zealand novels
Films directed by Ken Annakin
Films shot at Pinewood Studios
Films set in New Zealand
Films shot in New Zealand
British adventure drama films
Films set in 1821
Films scored by William Alwyn
Universal Pictures films
1954 drama films
1950s British films
Māori-language films